His New York Wife is a 1926 American silent drama film directed by Albert H. Kelley and starring Alice Day, Theodore von Eltz and Ethel Clayton.

Cast
 Alice Day as Lila Lake
 Theodore von Eltz as Philip Thorne
 Ethel Clayton as Alicia Duval
 Fontaine La Rue as Julia Hewitt
 Charles Cruz as Jimmy Duval
 Edith Yorke as Lila's aunt

References

Bibliography
 Munden, Kenneth White. The American Film Institute Catalog of Motion Pictures Produced in the United States, Part 1. University of California Press, 1997.

External links
 

1926 films
1926 drama films
1920s English-language films
American silent feature films
Silent American drama films
Films directed by Albert H. Kelley
American black-and-white films
Preferred Pictures films
1920s American films